H.E Mohammed Bin Khater Al-Khater is a Qatari diplomat serving as the current Qatar's ambassador to India. He is also a former Qatari ambassador to Indonesia.

References

Year of birth missing (living people)
Living people
Ambassadors of Qatar to Indonesia